Dan Carey (born April 23, 1982) is a former professional lacrosse player and current general manager and vice-president of lacrosse operations of the Rochester Knighthawks of the National Lacrosse League. Carey previously served as the general manager of the Colorado Mammoth. Carey played six seasons in the National Lacrosse League for both the Colorado Mammoth and the Toronto Rock. Carey was selected in the first round (seventh overall) by the Mammoth in the 2005 NLL Entry Draft after playing one season at Canisius College. Carey played three full seasons and part of a fourth before a concussion during a Major Series Lacrosse game forced him to miss part of the 2009 and all of the 2010 NLL seasons. Carey returned to the Mammoth during the 2011 season, scoring 13 goals and 22 assists in 12 games.

In July 2011, Carey was traded to the Toronto Rock for Creighton Reid and Mat McLeod. After one season in Toronto, during which he scored 25 points in 12 games, Carey announced his retirement due to a second concussion suffered near the end of the 2012 season.

In 2006, as a member of the Peterborough Lakers, Carey was awarded the Mike Kelly Memorial Trophy as most valuable player in the Mann Cup competition.

Carey is married to Lisa Foligno, the daughter of former NHL player Mike Foligno and the sister of current NHL players Nick Foligno and Marcus Foligno.

Statistics

NLL
Reference:

Awards

References

1982 births
Canadian expatriate sportspeople in the United States
Canadian lacrosse players
Canisius Golden Griffins men's lacrosse players
Colorado Mammoth players
Lacrosse forwards
Lacrosse people from Ontario
Living people
National Lacrosse League All-Stars
Sportspeople from Peterborough, Ontario
Toronto Rock players